Radomno  is a village in the administrative district of Gmina Nowe Miasto Lubawskie, within Nowe Miasto County, Warmian-Masurian Voivodeship, in northern Poland.

The village has a population of 520.

Notable residents
 Frederick Philip Grove (1879–1948) German-born Canadian novelist and translator

References

Radomno